Bruce Moncur Irons (6 October 1924 – 5 December 1983) was an engineer and mathematician, known for his fundamental contribution to the finite element method, including the patch test, the frontal solver and, along with Ian C. Taig, the isoparametric element concept.

He developed multiple sclerosis; finding it difficult to accept anticipated relapses, he committed suicide on 5 December 1983, and his wife followed suit.

References

External links
 Bruce M. Irons Memorial Scholarship

1924 births
20th-century Canadian mathematicians
1983 suicides